The left colic artery is a branch of the inferior mesenteric artery distributed to the descending colon, and left part of the transverse colon. It ends by dividing into an ascending branch and a descending branch; the terminal branches of the two branches go on to form anastomoses with the middle colic artery, and a sigmoid artery (respectively).

Structure 
The left colic artery usually represents the dominant arterial supply to the left colic flexure.

Course 
The left colic artery passes to the left posterior to the peritoneum. After a short but variable course, it divides into an ascending branch and a descending branch.

Branches and anastomoses

Ascending branch 
The ascending branch passes superior-ward. It passes anterior to the (ipsilateral) psoas major muscle, gonadal vessels, ureter, and kidney; it passes posterior to the inferior mesenteric vein. Its terminal branches form anastomoses with those of the middle colic artery; it also forms anastomoses with the descending branch (of the left colic artery).

Descending branch 
The descending branch passes inferolaterally. It forms anastomoses with the superior-most sigmoid artery as well as the ascending branch (of the left colic artery), thereby participating in the formation of the marginal artery of the colon.

Variation 
The left colic artery may have a common origin with a sigmoid artery, or may arise by branching of from a sigmoid artery. Occasionally, the left colic artery may arise from either the superior mesenteric artery, the middle colic artery, or the proximal-most jejunal artery; rarely, an accessory left colic artery may arise from the aforementioned arteries. An accessory left colic artery may also arise from the left colic artery itself.

Clinical significance 
The left colic artery may be ligated during abdominal surgery to remove colorectal cancer. This may have poorer outcomes than preserving the artery.

Additional images

References

External links
 Lotti M. Anatomy in relation to left colectomy
 
  - "Intestines and Pancreas: Branches of the Inferior Mesenteric Artery"
 
 

Arteries of the abdomen

pt:Artéria cólica direita